Grażyna Ewa Staniszewska (born 2 November 1949 in Biała Krakowska) is a Polish politician and Member of the European Parliament for the Silesian Voivodeship with the Freedom Union, part of the Alliance of Liberals and Democrats for Europe and sits on the European Parliament's Committee on Regional Development.

Staniszewska is a substitute for the Committee on Culture and Education, a member of the Delegation to the EU-Ukraine Parliamentary Cooperation Committee and a substitute for the Delegation to the EU-Bulgaria Joint Parliamentary Committee.

Education
 1972: Polish scholar, graduate of Polish Philology at the Jagiellonian University

Career
 1982-1983: Teacher at the Bielsko-Biała grammar-school (1972-1974), head of the Bielsko-Biała Culture Club (1974-1980) and instructor
 since 1984: Researcher at the REDOR Research and Development Centre in Bielsko-Biała
 1980-1981: Member of the administration and Podbeskidzie regional council of the independent, self-governing trade union NSZZ Solidarność
 1981: Founder and head of the Podbeskidzia Open Education Agency
 1983-1989: Interned under martial law (1981-1982) then arrested (1983), member of the underground authorities of NSZZ Solidarność
 1988-1990: Member of the underground and subsequently legal National Executive Committee of NSZZ Solidarność
 since 1992: Member of the national authorities of the Democratic Union, then the Freedom Union
 1989: Participant at the Round Table Conference
 1989-2001: Member of Parliament of the Polish Republic
 1997-2001: Chairman of the Parliamentary Committee on Education, Science and Youth
 2001-2004: Senator of the Republic of Poland
 since 1996: Chairman of the Council of the Foundation for Economic Education in Warsaw
 1998-: all-Poland coordinator of the programme for the preparation of youth for the information society 'Interkl@sa'

Decorations
 Order of St. Stephen for the development of Polish-Hungarian cooperation

Alleged collaboration with communist secret service

In 1992 she was accused by Antoni Macierewicz, then the Polish Minister of Internal Affairs of having collaborated with the communist-era secret services as a secret agent. She repeatedly denied the accusations and her name was eventually cleared by the Court of Appeal in Warsaw on 7 March 2000.

See also
2004 European Parliament election in Poland

References

External links
 
 
 

1949 births
Living people
Members of the Polish Sejm 1991–1993
Members of the Polish Sejm 1993–1997
Members of the Polish Sejm 1997–2001
Members of the Senate of Poland 2001–2005
Freedom Union (Poland) MEPs
MEPs for Poland 2004–2009
Jagiellonian University alumni